Vaalpens, also known as Kattea, as of the beginning of the 20th century, are a little-known nomadic people of South Africa, who survive in small groups in the Zoutpansberg and Waterberg districts of the Transvaal, especially along the Magalakwane River. They are akin to the Bushmen.

In 1905 their total number was estimated by the Transvaal military authorities at "a few hundreds". The Vaalpens ("dusty-bellies") were so called by the Boers from the dusty look of their bodies, due, it is said, to their habit of crawling along the ground when stalking game. But their true color is black. In height the men average about 4 ft., i.e. somewhat less than the shortest Bushmen.

Socially the Vaalpens occupy nearly as low a position as even the Fuegians or the extinct Tasmanians. They were nearly exterminated by the Amandebele, a tribe of Zulu stock which entered the Transvaal about the beginning of the 19th century. The Vaalpens, who live entirely by hunting and trapping game, dwell in holes, caves or rock-shelters. They wear capes of skins, and procure the few implements they need in exchange for skins, ivory or ostrich feathers. They form family groups of thirty or forty under a chief or patriarch, whose functions are purely domestic, as must be the case where there are no arts or industries, nothing but a knowledge of hunting and of fire with which to cook their meals. Their speech contains many click noises and was once considered incapable of expression by any Western phonetic system.

References

Ethnic groups in South Africa